Panthiades hebraeus is a butterfly in the family Lycaenidae. It was described by William Chapman Hewitson in 1867. It is found in Brazil, Paraguay and Argentina.

References

Butterflies described in 1867
Eumaeini
Lycaenidae of South America
Taxa named by William Chapman Hewitson